Marco Francesco Andrea Pirroni (born 27 April 1959, London, England) frequently credited simply as Marco, is a British guitarist, songwriter and record producer. He has worked with Adam Ant, Sinéad O'Connor, Siouxsie and the Banshees and many others from the late 1970s to the present day.

Siouxsie and the Banshees 
A linchpin of the UK punk scene, Pirroni's first appearance on stage was with Siouxsie and the Banshees in their début gig, at 1976's 100 Club Punk Festival. Future Sex Pistols bassist Sid Vicious was on drums.

Adam and the Ants/Adam Ant 
Pirroni was lead guitarist and co-songwriter in the second incarnation of Adam and the Ants, co-penning two UK number one singles and a further four Top Ten hits, with Ant. The two albums he co-wrote for Adam and the Ants, Kings of the Wild Frontier and Prince Charming, both made the Top 10 in the UK Albums Chart ("Kings" number 1; "Prince Charming" number 2).

When Adam and the Ants disbanded in 1982, Pirroni was retained as Adam Ant's co-writer and studio guitarist; they produced another number-one single ("Goody Two Shoes") and an album (Friend or Foe), followed by four more Top 20 hits. Ant and Pirroni won two shared Ivor Novello Awards for "Stand and Deliver".

The Wolfmen 
Pirroni was a member of the Wolfmen with Chris Constantinou. They released one EP, several singles, wrote music for television advertisements and released a début album, entitled Modernity Killed Every Night. The Wolfmen released their second album, Prisoners of Sodomy in 2011.

Personal life 
After living in London's Marylebone for several years, Pirroni relocated to north Derbyshire in 2013.

Discography
With Adam and the Ants
 Kings of the Wild Frontier (1980)
 Prince Charming (1981)

With Adam Ant
 Friend or Foe (1982)
 Strip (1983)
 Vive Le Rock (1985)
 Manners & Physique (1990)
 Persuasion (unreleased)
 Wonderful (1995)
 Adam Ant Is the Blueblack Hussar in Marrying the Gunner's Daughter (2013) - four tracks

With Sinéad O'Connor
 The Lion and the Cobra (1987)
 I Do Not Want What I Haven't Got (1990)
 Universal Mother (1994)
 How About I Be Me (And You Be You)? (2012)

With Spear of Destiny
 Outland (1987)

With The Slits
 Revenge of the Killer Slits (2006)

With The Wolfmen
 Modernity Killed Every Night (2008)
 Prisoners of Sodomy  (2011)
With Department S
"Wonderful Day"
"Is Vic There (Slight return)"

References

External links
 Official MySpace for The Wolfmen

1959 births
English people of Italian descent
Living people
English new wave musicians
English punk rock guitarists
Ivor Novello Award winners
Siouxsie and the Banshees members
Adam and the Ants members
English rock singers
People from Camden Town
Singers from London
Musicians from London
English male singer-songwriters
English record producers
Lead guitarists
Spear of Destiny (band) members
English male guitarists